As Yggdrasil Trembles is the 10th studio album by the Swedish death metal band Unleashed. It was released on March 19, 2010 by Nuclear Blast Records.

Track listing

Personnel
 Johnny Hedlund – vocals, bass
 Fredrik Folkare – lead guitar
 Tomas Måsgard – rhythm guitar
 Anders Schultz – drums

References

External links
  Unleashed Homepage

Unleashed (band) albums
2010 albums
Nuclear Blast albums
Norse mythology in music